The Raspberry Pi Foundation is a charity registered in England and Wales, as well as a UK company limited by guarantee.  It was founded in 2009 to promote the study of basic computer science in schools, and is responsible for developing the Raspberry Pi single-board computers.

Foundation

The Raspberry Pi Foundation is a charitable organization registered with the Charity Commission for England and Wales. The board of trustees was assembled by 2008 and the Raspberry Pi Foundation was founded as a registered charity in May 2009 in Caldecote, England. In 2016, The Foundation moved its headquarters to Station Road, Cambridge, moving again in 2018, to Hills Road, Cambridge.

The Foundation is supported by the University of Cambridge Computer Laboratory and Broadcom.
Its aim is to "promote the study of computer science and related topics, especially at school level, and to put the fun back into learning computing." Project co-founder Eben Upton is a former academic, currently employed by Broadcom as a system-on-chip architect and associate technical director. Components, albeit in small numbers, were able to be sourced from suppliers, due to the charitable status of the organization.

History
When the decline in numbers and skills of students applying for Computer Science became a concern for a team that included Eben Upton, Rob Mullins, Jack Lang and Alan Mycroft at the University of Cambridge’s Computer Laboratory in 2006, a need for a tiny and affordable computer came to their minds. Several versions of the early Raspberry Pi prototypes were designed but were very limited by the high cost and low power processors for mobile devices at that time.

In 2008, the team started a collaboration with Pete Lomas, MD of Norcott Technologies and David Braben, the co-author of the seminal BBC Micro game Elite, and formed the Raspberry Pi Foundation. Three years later, the Raspberry Pi Model B was born and it had sold over two million units within two years of mass production.

Founders and leadership

The founders of the organization were:

 Eben Upton 
 Rob Mullins, senior lecturer in the Computer Laboratory at the University of Cambridge
 Jack Lang, affiliated lecturer in the Computer Laboratory at the University of Cambridge and the founder of Electronic Share Information Ltd
 Alan Mycroft, professor of computing in the Computer Laboratory at the University of Cambridge
 David Braben, CEO of Frontier Developments and co-writer of the 1984 game Elite
 Pete Lomas, MD of Norcott Technologies

In early 2013 the organization split into two parts: Raspberry Pi Foundation, which is responsible for the charitable and educational activities; and Raspberry Pi Trading Ltd, responsible for the engineering and trading activities. Raspberry Pi (Trading) Ltd is a wholly owned subsidiary of Raspberry Pi Foundation, with the money earned from sales of Raspberry Pi products being used to fund the charitable work of the Foundation. Eben Upton was initially CEO of both divisions, but in September 2013 Lance Howarth became CEO of the Raspberry Pi Foundation, with Eben Upton remaining as CEO of Raspberry Pi (Trading) Ltd. Philip Colligan took over from Lance Howarth as CEO of Raspberry Pi Foundation in July 2015.

Logo
In October 2011, the Foundation's logo was selected from a number submitted from open competition. A shortlist of six was drawn up, with the final judging taking several days. The chosen design was created by Paul Beech and depicts a raspberry, in the style of a buckminsterfullerene molecule.

Education fund
In April 2014, the foundation announced a £1 million education fund to support projects that enhance the understanding of computing and to promote the use of technology in other subjects, particularly STEM and creative arts for children. They offered to provide up to 50% of the total projected costs to successful applicants. Carrie Anne Philbin was the Director of Education.

Mergers
In 2015 the Raspberry Pi Foundation merged with Code Club. In 2017 it merged with CoderDojo.

Trustees

As of February 2023, the foundation has nine trustees:

 Dr John Lazar, chair 	
 David Zahn
 Charles Richard Leadbeater
 Amali Chivanthi de Alwis
 Daniel Labbad
 Prof Richard Plumbly-Clegg
 Kim Shillinglaw
 Jonathan Ilan Drori
 Dr Matilda Phoebe Blyth

Past trustees have included: 

 Jack Lang (trustee and company secretary)
 David Braben
 David Cleevely (Chairman)
 Sherry Coutu
 Louis Glass (corporate lawyer; partner at Olswang)
 Pete Lomas
 Chris Mairs (chief scientist at Metaswitch Networks)

The Board of Trustees is elected by and supported by the Members of the Foundation, with Members serving in a voluntary role and coming from a range of backgrounds.

Early expectations
The Foundation expected that children would program using Scratch and that the input/output functionality would be used to control external devices. Additionally, the low power requirement facilitates battery-powered usage in robots, while the video capabilities have led to interest in use as a home media centre.

Magazine

The foundation, publishes Hello World, a "computing and digital making" magazine.

Products

Raspberry Pi

In 2011, the Raspberry Pi Foundation developed a single-board computer named the Raspberry Pi.  The Foundation's goal was to offer two versions, priced at US$25 and $35 (plus local taxes).  The Foundation started accepting orders for the higher priced model on 29 February 2012. Since then, several models with increased performance have been released.  The Raspberry Pi is intended to stimulate the teaching of computer science in schools.

Raspberry Pi Zero
In 2015 the foundation announced the Raspberry Pi Zero. This version of the microcomputer had a significantly reduced form factor and a lower price, launching at £4/$5. The new model features a 1 GHz, single-core CPU; 512 MiB RAM, USB and mini HDMI ports, micro USB power, and a HAT-compatible 40-pin header as well as composite video and reset headers . As a fully functioning Linux system the Raspberry Pi Zero's 1 GHz processor is comparable to the middle of the road for the Intel Pentium 3 architecture (450 MHz to 1.4 GHz), a standard in 2000. The reduced price and smaller form factor encourages use in smaller and embedded projects.

Raspberry Pi Pico
Raspberry Pi Pico was released in January 2021 with a retail price of $4. It was Raspberry Pi's first board based upon a single microcontroller chip; the RP2040, which was designed by Raspberry Pi in the UK. The Pico has 264 KB of RAM and 2 MB of flash memory. It is programmable in MicroPython, CircuitPython, C and Basic. It has partnered with Vilros, Adafruit, Pimoroni, Arduino and SparkFun to build Accessories for Raspberry Pi Pico and variety of other boards using RP2040 Silicon Platform. Rather than perform the role of general purpose computer (like the others in the range) it is designed for physical computing, similar in concept to an Arduino.

References

External links

 

Foundations based in the United Kingdom
Charities based in Cambridgeshire
Computer science organizations
Education advocacy groups
Educational charities based in the United Kingdom
Educational technology non-profits
Organizations established in 2009
Raspberry Pi